Darcy R. Martini (born January 30, 1969) is a Canadian former ice hockey player. He played two NHL games for the Edmonton Oilers.

Playing career
Martini was drafted 162nd overall by Edmonton in 1989 from Michigan Tech. He turned pro in 1992 and split the 1992–93 season in the American Hockey League with the Cape Breton Oilers and the East Coast Hockey League with the Wheeling Thunderbirds. In the 1993–94 NHL season, Martini played two games for Edmonton, it would be the only NHL experience he would receive. After spending the next few seasons bouncing around the minor leagues, Martini moved to Europe in 1996, joining Klagenfurt of the Austrian Hockey League where he spent two seasons. In 1998, he moved to the Deutsche Eishockey Liga in Germany with the Hannover Scorpions before returning to Klagenfurt. He spent his final two seasons in Italy and retired in 2002.

Career statistics

External links

1969 births
Living people
Canadian ice hockey defencemen
Cape Breton Oilers players
Edmonton Oilers draft picks
Edmonton Oilers players
Hannover Scorpions players
HC Merano players
Sportspeople from Castlegar, British Columbia
EC KAC players
Los Angeles Ice Dogs players
Michigan Tech Huskies men's ice hockey players
Minnesota Moose players
Portland Pirates players
San Francisco Spiders players
Wipptal Broncos players
Vernon Lakers players
Wheeling Thunderbirds players
Ice hockey people from British Columbia
Canadian expatriate ice hockey players in Austria
Canadian expatriate ice hockey players in Italy
Canadian expatriate ice hockey players in Germany